

Places 
United States
Woodworth, Illinois
Woodworth, Louisiana
Woodworth, North Carolina
Woodworth, North Dakota
Woodworth, Ohio
Canada
Rural Municipality of Woodworth, Manitoba

People 
 Charles E. Woodworth (1897-1966), Entomologist, Major in U.S. Army
 Charles W. Woodworth (1865-1940), Entomologist, suggested use of Drosophila for genetic research
 Dempster Woodworth (1844-1922), Wisconsin state senator
 Francis Channing Woodworth (1812-1859), writer of children's books.
 James Hutchinson Woodworth (1804-1869), Mayor of Chicago, U.S. Congressman
 John Woodworth (lawyer) (1768-1858), New York Attorney General 1804-1808
 John Maynard Woodworth (1837-1879), first surgeon-general of the United States
 Laurin D. Woodworth (1838-1897), U.S. Congressman
 Maria Woodworth-Etter (1844-1924), evangelist
 Mary Parker Woodworth (1849-1919), American writer and speaker
 Pete Woodworth (b. 1988), American baseball coach
 Robert Woodworth (politician) (b. 1743), New York state senator
 Robert S. Woodworth (1869-1962), American psychologist
 Samuel Woodworth (1784-1842), poet, author of the Old Oaken Bucket
 Selim E. Woodworth (1815-1871), U.S. Naval officer
 Walter Woodworth (1612-1686), early immigrant to the Plymouth Colony and progenitor of most American Woodworths
 William Woodworth (inventor) (1780-1839), inventor
 William W. Woodworth (1807-1873), U.S. Congressman

Other 
 Woodworth House, home of Joseph Woodworth in Los Angeles
 Woodworth House, the childhood home of Samuel Woodworth in Massachusetts
 C.W. Woodworth Award, an award for achievement in Entomology over the last ten years
 USS Woodworth (DD-460), a World War II era United States Navy destroyer

See also
Woodworth political family

Disambiguation pages with surname-holder lists